The Goh Chok Tong Cabinet, came in for the second from 1997 general elections to 2001.

Ministers

References

 

Executive branch of the government of Singapore
Lists of political office-holders in Singapore
Cabinets established in 1997